The Summers Baronetcy, of Shotton in the County of Flint, was a title in the Baronetage of the United Kingdom. It was created on 2 July 1952 for Geoffrey Summers. He was succeeded by his son, the second Baronet, who did not use the title. On his death in 1993 the baronetcy became extinct.

Summers baronets, of Shotton (1952)
Sir Geoffrey Summers, 1st Baronet (1891–1972)
(Sir) (Felix) Roland Brattan Summers, 2nd Baronet (1918–1993)

References

Extinct baronetcies in the Baronetage of the United Kingdom